Real Kung Fu is a Hong Kong television series first broadcast on TVB in October 2005. The series is shown to celebrate TVB's 38th anniversary. It aired every weeknight at 10:05 to 11:05 pm (Hong Kong Time).

Cast
 Note: Some of the characters' names are in Cantonese romanisation.

Viewership ratings

References

External links
TVB.com Real Kung Fu - Official Website 

TVB dramas
Martial arts television series
Television series set in the Qing dynasty
2005 Hong Kong television series debuts
2005 Hong Kong television series endings
Television shows set in Guangdong